The 2013 Dwars door Vlaanderen was the 68th edition of the Dwars door Vlaanderen cycle race and was held on 20 March 2013. The race started in Roeselare and finished in Waregem. The race was won by Oscar Gatto.

General classification

References

2013
2013 in road cycling
2013 in Belgian sport
March 2013 sports events in Europe